Aleksi Matinmikko (born 6 March 2000) is a Finnish ice hockey defenceman who plays for Porin Ässät in Liiga. Matinmikko can also play as a forward.

Career 
In the years 2019-2020 Aleksi Matinmikko played 27 games in Ässät putting up 1 point.

References 

Living people
2000 births
Finnish ice hockey defencemen
Ässät players
Sportspeople from Oulu